The 2008 NAB Cup was the Australian Football League pre-season competition played in its entirety before the Australian Football League's 2008 season began. It culminated with the Grand Final played on 8 March 2008 at AAMI Stadium in which St Kilda beat Adelaide by 5 points.

In their continuing attempt to grow Australian football internationally, the AFL played the opening game of the 2008 NAB Cup in Dubai, United Arab Emirates.

Games

Round 1

|- bgcolor="#CCCCFF"
| Home team
| Home team score
| Away team
| Away team score
| Ground
| Crowd
| Date
| Time
| Report
|- bgcolor="#FFFFFF"
| Collingwood
| 0.7.13 (55) 
| Adelaide
| 4.15.10 (136)
| Ghantoot Racing and Polo Club
| 6,102
| Saturday, 9 February
| 1:45 PM 8:45 PM (AEDT)
| AFL.com.au
|- bgcolor="#FFFFFF"
| St Kilda
| 1.15.12 (111)
| Richmond
| 2.7.11 (71)
| Telstra Dome
| 23,329
| Friday, 15 February
| 7:40 PM
| AFL.com.au
|- bgcolor="#FFFFFF"
| Western Bulldogs
| 1.6.9 (54)
| North Melbourne
| 1.4.10 (43)
| TIO Stadium
| 8,256
| Friday, 15 February 
| 7:40 PM
|AFL.com.au
|- bgcolor="#FFFFFF"
| Geelong
| 5.22.11 (188)
| Melbourne
| 2.11.5 (89)
| Skilled Stadium
| 15,000 est.
| Saturday, 16 February
| 4:40 PM
| AFL.com.au
|- bgcolor="#FFFFFF"
| Port Adelaide
| 0.12.13 (85)
| Carlton
| 1.13.13 (100)
| AAMI Stadium
| 9,133
| Saturday, 16 February 
| 5:40 PM
| AFL.com.au
|- bgcolor="#FFFFFF"
| Essendon
| 2.11.16 (100)
| Brisbane Lions
| 2.8.7 (73)
| Carrara Stadium
| 10,078
| Saturday, 16 February
| 7:40 PM
| AFL.com.au
|- bgcolor="#FFFFFF"
| Hawthorn
| 3.2.13 (52)
| Sydney
| 0.7.8 (50)
| Aurora Stadium
| 14,778
| Sunday, 17 February
| 3:40 PM
| AFL.com.au
|- bgcolor="#FFFFFF"
| Fremantle
| 2.12.14 (104)
| West Coast
| 1.7.9 (60)
| Subiaco Oval
| 32,502
| Sunday, 17 February
| 7:10 PM
| AFL.com.au

Round 2

|- bgcolor="#CCCCFF"
| Home team
| Home team score
| Away team
| Away team score
| Ground
| Crowd
| Date
| Time
| Report
|- bgcolor="#FFFFFF"
| Western Bulldogs
| 0.8.11 (59)
| Essendon  
| 3.12.14 (113)
| Telstra Dome
| 19,831
| Friday, 22 February
| 7:40 PM
|  AFL.com.au
|- bgcolor="#FFFFFF"
| St Kilda
| 3.9.10 (91)
| Geelong
| 3.8.11 (86)
| Manuka Oval
| 6,825
| Saturday, 23 February
| 3:40 PM
|AFL.com.au
|- bgcolor="#FFFFFF"
| Hawthorn
| 4.9.13 (103)
| Carlton
| 4.3.15 (69)
| Telstra Dome
| 20,940
| Saturday, 23 February
| 7:10 PM
| AFL.com.au
|- bgcolor="#FFFFFF"
| Adelaide
| 1.14.11 (104)
| Fremantle
| 1.12.6 (87)
| AAMI Stadium
| 10,394
| Sunday, 24 February
| 4:40 PM
| AFL.com.au

Round 3

|- bgcolor="#CCCCFF"
| Home team
| Home team score
| Away team
| Away team score
| Ground
| Crowd 
| Date
| Time
| Report
|- bgcolor="#FFFFFF"
| Essendon
|  1.12.10 (91)
| St Kilda
|  1.12.13 (94)
| Telstra Dome
| 26,079
| Friday, 29 February 
| 7:40 PM
| AFL.com.au
|- bgcolor="#FFFFFF"
| Adelaide
| 2.13.11 (107)
| Hawthorn 
| 1.11.9 (84)
| AAMI Stadium
| 14,033
| Saturday, 1 March
| 6:40 PM 
| AFL.com.au

Grand Final

|- bgcolor="#CCCCFF"
| Home team
| Home team score
| Away team
| Away team score
| Ground
| Crowd
| Date
| Time
| Report
|- bgcolor="#FFFFFF"
| Adelaide
| 0.9.10 (64)
| St Kilda
| 2.7.9 (69)
| AAMI Stadium
| 26,823
| Saturday, 8 March
| 6:50 PM
| AFL.com.au

Summary of results

See also 
2008 AFL season

References

Australian Football League pre-season competition
NAB Cup
NAB Cup